Corybantes is a genus of moths within the family Castniidae. It was described by Jacob Hübner in 1819.

Species
 Corybantes delopia (Druce, 1907)
 Corybantes mathani (Oberthür, 1881)
 Corybantes pylades (Stoll, [1782])
 Corybantes veraguana (Westwood, 1877)

References

Castniidae